Asir District is a district (bakhsh) in Mohr County, Fars Province, Iran. At the 2006 census, its population was 13,024, in 2,658 families.  The District has one city: Asir. The District has two rural districts (dehestan): Asir Rural District and Dasht-e Laleh Rural District.

References 

Mohr County
Districts of Fars Province